Chaunax is a genus of bony fish in the sea toad family Chaunacidae.

Species
There are currently 25 recognized species in this genus:

 Chaunax abei Y. Le Danois, 1978
 Chaunax africanus H.-C. Ho & Last, 2013 (African coffinfish)
 Chaunax apus Lloyd, 1909
 Chaunax atimovatae H.-C. Ho & W. C. Ma, 2016
 Chaunax brachysomus H.-C. Ho, Kawai & Satria, 2015 (Short-body frogmouth)
 Chaunax breviradius Y. Le Danois, 1978
 Chaunax endeavouri Whitley, 1929 (Coffinfish)
 Chaunax fimbriatus Hilgendorf, 1879 (Tasselled coffinfish)
 Chaunax flammeus Y. Le Danois, 1979
 Chaunax flavomaculatus H.-C. Ho, C. D. Roberts & A. L. Stewart, 2013 (Yellow-spot frogmouth)
 Chaunax gomoni H.-C. Ho, Kawai & Satria, 2015 (Gomon's frogmouth)
 Chaunax heemstraorum H.-C. Ho & W. C. Ma, 2016
 Chaunax hollemani H.-C. Ho & W. C. Ma, 2016
 Chaunax latipunctatus Y. Le Danois, 1984
 Chaunax mulleus H.-C. Ho, C. D. Roberts & A. L. Stewart, 2013 (Red-shoes frogmouth)
 Chaunax multilepis H.-C. Ho, Meleppura & Bineesh, 2016 (Indian spotted coffinfish)
 Chaunax nebulosus H.-C. Ho & Last, 2013 (Eye-spot coffinfish)
 Chaunax nudiventer H.-C. Ho & K. T. Shao, 2010 (Naked-belly coffinfish)
 Chaunax penicillatus McCulloch, 1915 (Pencil coffinfish)
 Chaunax pictus R. T. Lowe, 1846 (Pink frogmouth)
 Chaunax reticulatus H.-C. Ho, C. D. Roberts & A. L. Stewart, 2013 (Netted frogmouth)
 Chaunax russatus H.-C. Ho, C. D. Roberts & A. L. Stewart, 2013 (Red coffinfish)
 Chaunax stigmaeus Fowler, 1946 (Red-eye coffinfish)
 Chaunax suttkusi J. H. Caruso, 1989
 Chaunax umbrinus C. H. Gilbert, 1905

Description

The Head and body of the Chaunax suttkusi fish is a pale to rosy pink, with the tops and sides of the head and fins being red; the upper body frequently has yellow dots; while the lower surfaces are whitish. Lures are uniformly pale to dusky on all surfaces with dark threads in the nose cavity.

Habitat and diet

Members of the fish are primarily found near the ocean floor, along coral reefs, oysters, soft bottoms, and near muddy substrates. Their eating habits revolve around the oceanic floor, where there are occasionally only a few small marine species to be found. As a result, they developed an energy-saving mechanism to allow them to survive on less food. The fish family is a consistent predator. They move slowly enough that their prey is unaware of their existence. In the depths of the ocean floor, they prey on nearly anything, such as small marine fishes that may be part of their diet.

References

Chaunacidae
Deep sea fish
Marine fish genera
Ray-finned fish genera
Taxa named by Richard Thomas Lowe